Aliagarivorans marinus is a Gram-negative, heterotrophic, facultatively anaerobic and agarolytic bacterium from the genus of Aliagarivorans which has been isolated from seawater from the An-Ping Harbour in Taiwan.

References

Bacteria described in 2016
Alteromonadales